A scientist is a person who engages in science. Alternatively, it can refer to someone that supports scientism.

Scientist or The Scientist may also refer to:


People
 Robert Karlsson (born 1969), Swedish professional golfer nicknamed "The Scientist"
 Scientist (musician) (born 1960), Jamaican dub musician Hopeton Brown

Music
 "Scientist" (Twice song), a 2021 single by Twice from their album, Formula of Love: O+T=<3
 The Scientists (established 1979), an Australian post-punk band
 "The Scientist" (song), a 2002 single by Coldplay
 The Scientists of Modern Music (established 2005), an Australian electronic music group

Print
 The Scientist (magazine), a life sciences magazine
 The Scientists (book), a 2012 book about 43 top scientists of all time

Television
 "The Scientist" (Arrow), eighth episode of the 2013 second season of the TV show Arrow

See also
Science (disambiguation)